The Western Cape Department of Health is a department of the Government of the Western Cape, responsible for providing public healthcare to the population of the Western Cape province of South Africa.

The political head of the department is the Provincial Minister of Health;  this is Nomafrench Mbombo of the Democratic Alliance. The administrative head is the Superintendent-General of Health;  this was Professor Craig Househam. 
In the 2010/11 financial year, the department had 27,993 employees and a budget of R11,962,863,000.

Hospitals
In the Western Cape there are 428 public primary care facilities (clinics and community health centres), some operated by the Department of Health, while others are operated by the City of Cape Town and funded by transfer payments from the department.

Public secondary care services are provided by 32 district hospitals, six regional hospitals, and three central hospitals (which also provide tertiary care; see below).

Three central hospitals in Cape Town provide tertiary care; these are Groote Schuur Hospital, Tygerberg Hospital, and Red Cross War Memorial Children's Hospital. They take specialist referrals from other hospitals across the province, and in many cases from other provinces or even other African countries.

The department also runs various specialised facilities, including six tuberculosis hospitals, four psychiatric hospitals, and a rehabilitation centre.

See also
 Department of Health (South Africa)
 Healthcare in South Africa
 List of hospitals in South Africa

References

External links
 Official website

Health
Western Cape
Ministries established in 1994
Medical and health organisations based in South Africa